Thomas S. Danna (February 19, 1946 – January 26, 2003) was an American football coach.  He served as the head football coach at Michigan Technological University from 1985 to 1986 and at Northwood University in Midland, Michigan from 1987 to 1992, compiling a career college football coaching record of 19–56. Danna played college football at Eastern Michigan University before embarking on a coaching career.

References

1946 births
2003 deaths
Eastern Michigan Eagles football players
James Madison Dukes football coaches
Michigan Tech Huskies football coaches
Northwood Timberwolves football coaches
High school basketball coaches in Michigan
High school football coaches in Michigan
Road incident deaths in Michigan